The Education Act 1695 (7 Will.3 c.4), was an Act of the Parliament of Ireland, one of a series of Penal Laws, prohibiting Catholics from sending their children to be educated abroad. Its long title is "An Act to restrain Foreign Education".

External links
Full Text of the Act

Acts of the Parliament of Ireland (pre-1801)
1695 in Ireland
1695 in law
17th century in education
Penal Laws in Ireland